Kraken is a steel roller coaster located at SeaWorld Orlando in Florida, United States. The coaster was named after a fictional sea monster of the same name. In late 2016, Kraken underwent a refurbishment and reopened as Kraken Unleashed in June 2017. A virtual reality experience was added to the ride, but due to technical difficulties and extensive wait times, the feature was permanently removed the following year.

History

Kraken (2000–2016, 2018-present)
In 1999, Six Flags Great Adventure spent $42 million on new attractions including a prototype Floorless Coaster by Bolliger & Mabillard, Medusa (later Bizarro and back to Medusa). The immediate popularity of the ride led SeaWorld Orlando and three other amusement parks to announce plans to install Floorless Coasters in 2000; aside from the announcement of Kraken on May 6, 1999, Six Flags Discovery Kingdom announced Medusa, Geauga Lake announced Dominator, and Six Flags Fiesta Texas announced Superman: Krypton Coaster. Kraken was announced as costing approximately $18–20 million. Krakens announcement more than one year out from its opening was an attempt by the park to drive international attendance.

Construction for the ride was well underway in January 2000. During construction, Superior Rigging & Erection was responsible for erecting the supports and track of the roller coaster.

On June 1, 2000, Kraken officially opened to the public. At the time of opening Kraken held the record for the tallest and longest roller coaster in the state of Florida. It held this record until 2006 when Disney's Animal Kingdom opened the  Expedition Everest.

Kraken Unleashed (2017–2018) 
On September 27, 2016, the park announced that the ride would undergo extensive refurbishment and reopen in 2017 with virtual reality headsets. It reopened as Kraken Unleashed on June 16, 2017. This update also featured an original orchestral score by Rick McKee for the VR film, as well as original area music. In early 2018, the virtual reality headsets were removed from the attraction’s ride vehicles and the ride went back to being Kraken due to technical difficulties. They returned to the ride in June 2018. Later that summer, the virtual reality was permanently removed due to slow dispatches and excessive wait times.

In 2022, Kraken was repainted with seafoam green track and dark teal supports.

Characteristics

Statistics
The ride features seven inversions including two vertical loops, a dive loop, a spiraling camelback (zero-g roll), a cobra roll and a flat spin (corkscrew).

Trains

Kraken operates with three floorless trains. Each train seats 32 riders in eight rows of four. This gives the ride a theoretical hourly capacity of 1500 riders per hour. The open-air trains feature seats which leave riders' legs dangling above the track. Riders are restrained with over-the-shoulder restraints. As the trains are floorless, the station has a retractable floor for safe boarding.

Theme
Kraken is themed after the mythological sea monster of the same name, kept caged by Poseidon. Much of the ride is located above water, with three sections featuring subterranean dives. The ride's station and surrounding area are themed as Kraken's lair. Eels are said to be Kraken's young and therefore feature throughout the ride's queue. A SeaWorld Orlando spokesman stated "although it's a roller coaster, the theme of the ride brings it back to the sea, and to our (SeaWorld Orlando's) core".

Ride experience
After riders have boarded, the station floor is retracted and the front gates open. Kraken departs with a right U-turn out of the station. This leads directly to the  chain lift hill. At the top, the train crests the lift hill and follows a fairly level turn to the right before dropping  towards the ground. The ride then enters the first 128-foot-tall (39m) vertical loop followed by a diving loop, passing by Mako's lift hill. A spiraling camelback (zero-g roll), where riders experience a feeling of weightlessness, is followed by a cobra roll. A banked turn to the left leads into the mid-course brake run. The exit from the mid-course brake run drops down directly into the second vertical loop. A subterranean dive into Kraken's lair is followed by a corkscrew. The ride concludes with a final brake run and a short path back to the station.

Reception
The Orlando Sentinel commended the ride for "perfect timing and keeping folks guessing", giving the ride ratings of 4 out of 5 for both thrill and theming. Sentinel reporter Dewayne Bevil ranks the ride at number 7 in his Top 50 Orlando Theme Park Attractions list. Although it was reported that the ride would be more exciting than The Incredible Hulk at the nearby Islands of Adventure theme park, Mike Thomas of the Sentinel concluded that "Hulk clobbers the competition", with Kraken taking the number two spot. In an interview for the Los Angeles Times, Jerry Dane of the Florida Coaster Club described the floorless experience like "you are hung out there open and free". Dane also commended the ride's ability to provide different, yet equally good experiences in a variety of seats. In 2012, Kraken was featured on the Travel Channel TV series Insane Coaster Wars, and received first place in the public-voted "Wrong Way Up" category. Theme Park Review's Robb Alvey shared the view that Kraken was better than the competition which included Dollywood's Wild Eagle and Dorney Park & Wildwater Kingdom's Hydra the Revenge.

In Amusement Today's annual Golden Ticket Awards, Kraken was ranked in the top 50 steel roller coasters numerous times since its opening. It debuted on the poll at position 48 in 2003, peaked at position 23 in 2004, before it off the poll in 2009.

Early reception to Kraken Unleashed was mixed, with theme park enthusiasts noting long dispatch times as the main detractor. Overall VR experience seemed to be positive, however.

References

External links
 
 
 

Kraken in popular culture
Roller coasters in Greater Orlando
Roller coasters introduced in 2000
Roller coasters introduced in 2017
Floorless Coaster roller coasters manufactured by Bolliger & Mabillard
Roller coasters operated by SeaWorld Parks & Entertainment
SeaWorld Orlando
Roller coasters in Florida
2000 establishments in Florida